Sangre Nueva (New Blood) is a compilation album by Héctor el Father and reggaeton producer Naldo. Its purpose is to introduce new artists from the reggaeton genre to the audience. It presents the new generation of reggaeton. It was created to respond to the tidal wave of worldwide interest in reggaeton. The album is one of the most popular reggaeton albums released. Sangre Nueva featured a host of guest artists and marked the beginning of many future reggaeton stars, such as Arcángel & De La Ghetto, Yomo, Franco el Gorila, Gadiel, Kartier and Dandyel. Sangre Nueva (special edition) was released on April 25, 2006.

Track listing 
Disc one
"Intro" and "Sácala" (by Héctor el Father, Naldo, Don Omar, Wisin & Yandel)  – 4:50
"A Romper La Disco" (by Tommy Viera and Daddy Yankee)  – 2:48
"Déjale Caer To' el Peso" (by Héctor el Father and Yomo)  – 4:10
"Restralla" (by Franco el Gorila, Wisin)  – 2:52
"Se La Monté" (by Gadiel, Lobo, and Yandel)  – 2:54
"Gata Psycho" (by Wibal & Alex)  – 2:51
"Bailando Sola" (by Kartier)  – 3:33
"Ven Pégate" (by Arcángel & De La Ghetto, Zion)  – 3:55
"Guerrilla" (by Ñengo Flow and Julio Voltio)  – 3:06
"Nueva Sangre" (by Abrante & Caico, Tego Calderón)  – 3:14
"5 Minutos" (by Naldo)  – 3:17
"Tigresa" (by Joan & O'Neill)  – 2:34
"La Cola" (by Jomar and Héctor el Father)  – 2:45
"Pa' Que Sudes" (by K-Mill)  – 2:29
"Sedúceme" (by Danny & Chillin)  – 7:32

Disc two
"Intro" (by Héctor el Father, Naldo, Don Omar, Wisin & Yandel)  – 5:23
"Uaaa" (by Ariel and Notty)  – 2:23
"Activaó" (by Mr. Philips and Baby Ranks)  – 2:51
"Cuando Bailes" (by Varon)  – 2:53
"How You Feel" (by Severe & Sincere)  – 3:03
"Rómpela" (by Albert & el Skizzo)  – 2:31
"Descontrólate" (by Dandyel, Angel & Khriz)  – 3:27
"Mil Envidiosos" (by Yo-Seph)  – 2:58
"Pégala" (by Q-Killa)  – 2:12
"La Carretilla" (by Jenny la Sexy Voz)  – 2:18
"Tengo Control" (by Odyssey, Yaga & Mackie)  – 3:23
"Quiero" (by Felina)  – 2:47
"Slow Down" (by Moreno Luzunariz)  – 3:19
"Me Huele a Guerra" (by Noztra)  – 3:45

Music videos 
"Sácala" – Wisin & Yandel, Naldo, Héctor el Father, Don Omar, Daddy Yankee, Tego Calderón, Julio Voltio, Zion
"Déjale Caer To' el Peso" – Yomo featuring Héctor
"Bailando Sola" – Kartier
"Uaa" – Ariel featuring Notty
"Pa' Que Sudes" – K-Mill
"Gata Psycho" – Wibal & Alex
"No Quiere Novio" – Ñejo
"Que Se Retire" – Naldo
"Yo Sigo Aqui" – Naldo featuring Héctor
"Voy" – Naldo
"Yo Sigo Aqui (live)" – Naldo featuring Héctor

Chart performance

References 

Reggaeton albums
2006 compilation albums
Albums produced by Luny Tunes
Albums produced by Nely